Ramshorn is a civil parish in the district of East Staffordshire, Staffordshire, England.  It contains seven listed buildings that are recorded in the National Heritage List for England.  Of these, one is listed at Grade I, the highest of the three grades, two are at Grade II*, the middle grade, and the others are at Grade II, the lowest grade.  The most important building in the parish is Wootton Lodge, a country house, which is listed together with associated structures.  The parish is otherwise mainly rural, and the other listed buildings are a farmhouse, and an associated coach house and stable.


Key

Buildings

References

Citations

Sources

Lists of listed buildings in Staffordshire